Sheena Librel Belarmino (born December 15, 2005), is a Filipino Actress, Singer and Dancer/Performer,  often referred to as Inday Wonder (Wonder Girl).

Sheena rose to prominence after becoming a grand finalist on Tawag ng Tanghalan Kids in 2017 alongside TNT boys. 

In 2015, she joined Dance Kids and made it into the quarter finals. Belarmino also garnered a record of most wins (5 wins) on Your Face Sounds Familiar Kids Season 2 where she emerged as the 4th placer in the Grand Finals.

Belarmino is a member of the all-female group New Gen Divas along with Elha Nympha, Fana and Janine Berdin.

Personal life 
Belarmino was born on December 15, 2005 in Cebu City, Philippines. She started singing and dancing at the age of three. As the youngest of five siblings, her mother often describes her as timid at home but is confident on stage. She is also a star student and a high achiever at school. Belarmino went to University of Cebu.

Career

Dance Kids 
In 2015, Belarmino joined Dance Kids. At nine-years old, she was one of the youngest contender from the Visayas. She made it to the quarter finals in which AC Bonifacio and Lucky Ancheta (collectively known as Lucky Aces) emerged as the winner of the said competition.

Tawag ng Tanghalan Kids 
In 2017, Belarmino joined Tawag ng Tanghalan kids. She sang Rachel Platten's "Fight Song" in which she won as the daily winner.

She stunned the judges with her performance of Demi Lovato's "Stone Cold" garnered almost 5 million views on Youtube. She was hailed as the 4th placer and became the only female grand finalist against all other male contenders including the TNT Boys in which John Clyde Talili emerged as the winner.

Your Face Sounds Familiar Kids: Season 2 
In 2018, Belarmino joined Your Face Sounds Familiar Kids Season 2. The show lasted for 15 weeks. In the pilot episode, She impersonated the Popstar Royalty Sarah Geronimo and performed "Tala" which bagged her the first win. The performance became viral with 9.8 million+ views on Youtube.

Belarmino also impersonated Darren Espanto, Whitney Houston, Chris Brown, Jennifer Lopez, Nicki Minaj, Regine Velasquez, Ariana Grande, Jessa Zaragoza, Sharon Cuneta, Olivia Newton-John, Donna Summer, Alanis Morissette, Miley Cyrus and Ariana Grande (together with AC Bonifacio), and Beyoncé.

Her performance as KZ Tandingan earned her a top trending spot on Youtube. Belarmino has five wins in total, the most wins in the entire YFSF run.

ASAP Natin ‘To 
Belarmino was previously part of a Sing and Dance girl group called Just A.S.K., together with AC Bonifacio and Krystal Brimner. The trio initially performed on Gandang Gabi, Vice! with fans asking the network to debut them as an official girl group. The Trio also had the chance to perform with their Idol, Sarah Geronimo on ASAP Natin ‘To The trio would debut as a group on March 1, 2020, however, due to the COVID-19 restrictions in the country, the group's stint was short-lived.

At the age of 15, Belarmino is the youngest regular performer on the show.

Star Magic 
Belarmino signed a contract with Star Magic along with several other stars during the ABS CBN's Black Pen Day on June 19, 2021.

Discography

Filmography

Television / Digital

Awards and nominations

References

External Links 

  
  
 
 
 

Living people
21st-century Filipino women singers
ABS-CBN
Talent show winners
ABS-CBN personalities
Filipino female dancers
Tawag ng Tanghalan contestants
2005 births
Filipino women pop singers
Star Music artists
Singers from Cebu
Singers from Cebu City
Participants in Philippine reality television series